Yessie is the second studio album by Canadian singer-songwriter Jessie Reyez. It was released on September 16, 2022, by FMLY and Island Records. Preceded by the first single, "Mutual Friend", released on August 12, 2022, the album was recorded between 2020 and 2022 during a time of "self-love and self-care".

Critical reception 

Yessie has received generally positive reviews. Robin Murray of Clash gave the album a positive review, calling the record "scintillating" and "one that gleams with ambition and refuses to linger on the past".

Track listing

Notes
 "Mood" samples "Los Caminos De La Vida", performed by Los Diablitos.

References 

2022 albums
Jessie Reyez albums
Island Records albums